Dale Baynes (born 29 November 1980) is a former Australian rules footballer who played one game for Collingwood in the Australian Football League in 2000.  Originally from Geraldton, Western Australia he was recruited from East Fremantle in the West Australian Football League with the 75th selection in the 1999 AFL Draft.

He currently plays for Towns Football Club in the Great Northern Football League and has represented Western Australia in the National Country Football Championships.

References

External links
 	
 WAFL playing statistics

Collingwood Football Club players
East Fremantle Football Club players
Living people
1980 births
Australian rules footballers from Geraldton